Devincenzia is an extinct genus of giant flightless predatory birds in the family Phorusrhacidae or "terror birds" that lived during the Early Miocene (Deseadan) Fray Bentos Formation of Uruguay and Late Miocene (Huayquerian) Ituzaingó Formation to Early Pliocene (Montehermosan) of Argentina. The type species D. pozzi was formerly known as Onactornis pozzi.

Etymology 
The generic name Devincenzia comes from Uruguayan museum director and zoologist Garibaldi Devincenzi (1882-1943) and the specific name of D. gallinali comes from Alejandro Gallinal, another Uruguayan scientist. The specific name of D. pozzi was after the lead taxidermist at the museum, Antonio Pozzi.

History and taxonomy 
In 1931, a very large distal right tarsometatarsus associated with a ungual phalanx from digit II, was described by the Uruguayan Paleontologist Lucas Kraglievich as a new species of Phororhacos (a misspelling of Phorusrhacos), P. pozzi and deposited at the Museo Argentino de Ciencias Naturales Bernardino Rivadavia in Buenos Aires, Argentina under specimen numbers MACN-6554 and 6681. The fossils had been found in Lower Pliocene rock layers at El Brete in Cordoba, Argentina, specifically from the Mesopotamian. Later in the same paper, Kraglievich named a subspecies of Phororhacos (Phorusrhacos) longissimus mendocinus based on a partial proximal right femur from the Late Miocene Huayquerías Formation in Mendoza, Argentina. The subspecies has since been synonymized with Devincenzia pozzi. Kraglievich also referred a synphysis fragment to Phororhacos (Phorusrhacos) platygnathus, but the fossil has since been referred to Devincenzia pozzi. The next year, Kraglievich named a new genus and species of Phorusrhacid from Argentina based on a partial right tarsometatarsus of a juvenile individual (MNHN-M-189), naming it Devincenzia gallinali. The origin of the fossil is unknown, with Kraglievich initially speculating that it was from Uruguay, but the coloration corroborates with that of Patagonian fossils from the Miocene. Although they are sometimes considered distinct, Herculano Alvarenga and Elizabeth Höfling synonymized the two species in 2013 in their reassesment of Phorusrhacidae and moved P. pozzi to Devincenzia in the same paper.

In August 1936 in a lagoon at Campo de Robilotte on Lake Epecuén, around 600 km southwest of the city of Buenos Aires, Antonio Castro collected a partial skull and two pedal phalanges of a large Phorusrhacid, as well as fossils of other Cenozoic fossil taxa like Xenarthrans and Macraucheniids. The fossils were sent to the Museo de la Plata, where they were described by Angelo Cabrera in 1939, naming the Phorusrhacid specimens (MLP 37-III-7-8) Onactornis depressus. Parts of the Onactornis skull are missing, so they were reconstructed with plaster to be put on display at the MLP, but this has caused some of the preserved parts to be confused with the plaster ones. P. pozzi and P. longissimus mendocinus were moved to Onactornis by Pierce Brodkorb, who also believed that Devincenzia gallinali was a synonym of Brontornis. The Ituzaingo Formation also bears Devincenzia fossils, including a pedal phalange, tibiotarsus fragment, tarsometatarsus fragment, a cervical vertebra, and a dorsal vertebra that were referred to D. gallinali based on size and morphology. Two other fossil remains include a right tarsometatarsus, about 40 cm long, lacking the inner knuckle, probably from the Arroyo Roman river basin in the Río Negro Department, and the lower articular end of another tarsometatarsus. These specimens come from the upper Pliocene and lower Pleistocene, extending the potential range of the taxon.

Description 
Devincenzia was one of the largest representatives of Phorusrhacidae. It surpassed the type genus Phorusrhacos, whose total height is given at about 2.4 m, making it potentially the largest phorusrhacid. The probable body weight of Devincenzia is given as about 161 kg. It probably resembled its relatives Phorusrhacos and Kelenken, like them, it was equipped with a narrow body, conspicuously elongated walking legs, and retracted wings. 

The skull was preserved with the rear part and areas of the upper jaw. Reconstructed, it was probably about 64.5 cm long, which roughly corresponded to the known skull of Phorusrhacos, but was slightly smaller than that of Kelenken. When viewed from above, it had a wedge shape, reaching a width of 32.3 cm at the occipital bone and a height of 12.7 cm. The height of the skull at the back of the head corresponded to about 39% of the width, which is less than in Phorusrhacos with 47% or Psilopterus with 48%. In this regard, the skull of Devincenzia more closely resembled that of Kelenken. It narrowed towards the front, with the width at the frontal bone being 24.4 cm, and at the temporal fossa it drew in significantly and measured 19.1 cm. The frontal bone was very wide, and the two processes occurring there, the processus postorbitalis and the processus supraorbitalis, were separated by a deep recess. The quadrate appeared comparatively large, differing from that of Psilopterus in addition to the different design of the three extensions, among other things, by the comparatively smaller part of the main bone, which was connected to the cheekbone. Likewise, the os quadratojugale showed a more robust structure and was comparatively higher. Since the upper jaw is incomplete, and only the middle section is available, the dimensions of the beak can only be inferred. Using dimensions from other phorusrhacids, it may have been 36 cm long and 17 cm high. The symphysis of the lower jaw, which has also been handed down in fragments, had a much narrower and lower shape than in Brontornis. It was only preserved to a length of 11 cm, but it would have reached a length of around 16 cm. At the rear end it was 6.2 cm wide and 4.7 cm thick, and towards the front it became significantly lower, measuring about 2.8 cm at half length. The underside had a slight curvature, more pronounced than that of Physornis, which had a nearly flat surface. The externally visible foramina were wide and deep.

Of the few surviving elements of the body skeleton, a complete tibiotarsus remained, and it was 72 cm long and 10.4 cm wide at the lower end of the joint, resembling that of Phorusrhacos in its long and slender build, although it was larger. At the lower end of the joint it had a bony bridge (pons supratendineus) that was conspicuous for the phorusrhacids. In addition, the lower inner joint roller protruded further forward than that of Galliformes. An almost complete specimen, missing only the inner jointed roller, reached a length of 40 cm and a width at the top of 11 cm. In the middle of the shaft, the side edges drew in significantly further than in Phorusrhacos, which showed a relatively even course of the diaphysis there. With a width of 4.3 cm, the middle joint roll at the bottom was significantly more voluminous than the other two and indicates that Devincenzia's middle toe was also more massive. The first toe of the third (middle) ray measured 12.5 cm in length. It was long and narrow with a width of 5.3 cm and a height of 5.7 cm. The surviving end phalange of the second toe measured around 9 cm, had an oval cross-section, was strongly curved in side view, and was strongly pressed laterally. The width at the joint end facing the body was 2.4 cm and the height was 3.9 cm.

Paleobiology 
Phorusrhacids are though to have been ground predators or scavengers, and have often been considered apex predators that dominated Cenozoic South America in the absence of mammalian predators, though they did co-exist with some large, carnivorous borhyaenid mammals. Earlier hypotheses of phorusrhacid feeding ecology were mainly based on them possessing large skulls with hooked beaks rather than through detailed hypotheses and biomechanical studies, and such studies of their running and predatory adaptations were only tested from the beginning of the 21st century.

Alvarenga and Elizabeth Höfling made some general remarks about phorusrhacid habits in a 2003 article. They were flightless, as evidenced by the proportional size of their wings and body mass, and wing-size was more reduced in larger members of the group. They pointed out that the narrowing of the pelvis, upper maxilla, and thorax may have been adaptations for hunting in regions with high vegetation, which would permit greater agility when moving between vertical obstacles. The narrow upper maxilla would also help catching small animals hidden among tree trunks or stones. The large expansions above the eyes formed by the lacrimal bones (similar to what is seen in modern hawks) would have protected the eyes against the sun, and enabled keen eyesight, which indicates they hunted by sight in open, sunlit areas, and not shaded forests.

A 2010 study by Degrange and colleagues of Andalgalornis, based on Finite Element Analysis using CT scans, estimated its bite force and stress distribution in its skull, and showed that it had lost a large degree of intracranial immobility (mobility of skull bones in relation to each other), as was also the case for other large phorusrhacids. These researchers interpreted this loss as an adaptation for enhanced rigidity of the skull, and compared to the modern red-legged seriema and white-tailed eagle, the skull of the phorusrhacid showed relatively high stress under sideways loadings, but low stress where force was applied up and down, and in simulations of “pullback”. Due to the relative weakness of the skull at the sides and middle, these researchers considered it unlikely that Andalgalornis engaged in potentially risky behavior that involved using its beak to subdue large, struggling prey. Instead, they suggested that it either fed on smaller prey that could be killed and consumed more safely, by for example swallowing it whole, or that when targeting large prey, it used a series of well-targeted repetitive strikes with the beak, in a "attack-and-retreat" strategy. Struggling prey could also be retained with the feet, despite the lack of sharp talons.

A 2012 follow up study by Tambussi and colleagues analyzed the flexion abilities of the neck of Andalgalornis, based on the morphology of its neck vertebrae, finding the neck to be divided into three sections. They concluded that the neck musculature and skeleton of Andalgalornis was adapted to carrying a large head, and for helping it rise after a maximum downwards strike, and the researchers assumed the same would be true for other large, big-headed phorusrhacids. A 2020 study of phorusrhacid skull morphology by Degrange found that there were two main morphotypes within the group, derived from a seriema-like ancestor; the "Psilopterine Skull Type", which was plesiomorphic (more similar to the ancestral type), and the "Terror Bird Skull Type", which included Andalgalornis and other large members, that was more specialized, with more rigid and stiff skulls. Despite the differences, studies have shown the two types handled prey similarly, while the more rigid skulls and resulting larger bite force of the "Terror Bird" type would have been an adaptation to handling larger prey.

Phylogeny 
Due to the fragmentary nature of Devincenzia fossils and the internal taxonomy of the genus being in a flux, its classification within Phorusrhacidae frequently changes. Despite this, Devincenzia is frequently found to be a member of the Phorusrhacinae along with Phorusrhacos, Kelenken, Titanis, and possibly the Patagornithines as well. The following phylogenetic tree shows the internal relationships of Phorusrhacidae under the exclusion of Brontornis as published by Degrange and colleagues in 2015, which recovers Devincenzia as a member of a large clade that includes Physornis, Phorusrhacos and Andalgalornis, among others.

After the extinction of the non-bird dinosaurs, during the early Cenozoic, mammals underwent an evolutionary diversification, and birds around the world developed a tendency towards gigantism; this includes the Gastornithidae, the Dromornithidae, the Palaeognathae, and the Phorusrhacidae. Phorusrhacids are an extinct group within Cariamiformes, the only living members of which are the two species of seriemas in the family Cariamidae. While they are the most speciose group within Cariamiformes, the interrelationships between phorusrhacids are unclear due to the incompleteness of their remains.Phorusrhacids were present in South America from the Paleocene (when the continent was an isolated island) and survived until the Pleistocene. They also appeared in North America probably due to the Great American Biotic Interchange, and while there are records from Europe, these are disputed. It is unclear where the group originated; both cariamids and phorusrhacids may have arisen in South America, or arrived from elsewhere when southern continents were closer together or when sea levels were lower, and they may also have made reverse movements. Since phorusrhacids survived until the Pleistocene, they appear to have been more successful than for example the South American metatherian thylacosmilid predators (which disappeared in the Pliocene), and it is possible that they competed ecologically with placental predators that invaded from North America in the Pleistocene.

Paleoenvironment 

Devincenzia fossils usually have poor locality records, but fossils are primarily known from the Upper Miocene, Pliocene and lower Pleistocene of Argentina, though the holotype was originally speculated to be from Uruguay. Some fossils have been unearthed from the Ituzaingo Formation of Mesopotamia, Argentina, which preserves vast tidal flats similar to those in the modern day Amazon and a warm climate. Large, herbivorous notoungulate mammals in the Ituzaingo Formation were widespread, including the toxodontids Xotodon and Adinotherium, smaller notoungulates such as Protypotherium, smaller litopterns such as Brachytherium, Cullinia, Diadiaphorus, Neobrachytherium, Oxyodontherium, Paranauchenia, Promacrauchenia, Proterotherium and Scalabrinitherium. Carnivores included the other phorusrhacid Andalgalornis and sparassodonts, with giant crocodilians like Gryposuchus and Mourasuchus in the freshwater. Bamboos, coconut palms, and other palms were prevalent. The Huayquerias Formation also preserves fossils, but has much fewer preserved taxa and has had less exploration. Its paleoenvironment was hypothesized to be a gravely fluvial environment near large mountains and small lakes. The strata dates to the Upper Miocene. Fossils of litopterns and ground sloths are the most common. The unusual carnivorous armadillo Macroeuphractus is also known from the formation. At the Campo de Robilotte locality on Lake Epecuén near Buenos Aires, Argentina, in the Cerro Azul Formation, several fossil mammals were uncovered alongside the holotype of Onactornis depressus, a synonym of Devincenzia, in 1936 and many were described by Angelo Cabrera as new fossil species and even some genera, though few remain valid. Fossils of several kinds of litopterns have been found, such as the macraucheniid Huayqueriania, the proterothere Eoauchenia, and several mesotheriids like Pseudotypotherium and Typotheriopsis. Many xenarthrans fossils were unearthed and described by Cabrera including the type specimen of the glyptodont Coscinocercus and the type specimen of the ground sloths, Proscelidodon and Mcdonaldocnus.

References 

Phorusrhacinae
Extinct flightless birds
Miocene birds of South America
Pliocene birds of South America
Deseadan
Montehermosan
Neogene Argentina
Fossils of Argentina
Ituzaingó Formation
Neogene Uruguay
Fossils of Uruguay
Paraná Basin
Fossil taxa described in 1932